Mount Pleasant Township is one of twelve townships in Delaware County, Indiana. According to the 2010 census, its population was 14,102 and it contained 6,157 housing units. The school system is Yorktown Community Schools in Yorktown.

History
The Martin Hofherr Farm was listed on the National Register of Historic Places in 1992.

Geography

Cities and towns
 Muncie (west edge)
 Yorktown

Unincorporated towns
 Cammack
 Reed Station
 West Muncie (Historical)

Adjacent townships
 Harrison Township (north)
 Center Township (east)
 Monroe Township (southeast)
 Salem Township (south)
 Richland Township, Madison County (west)
 Monroe Township, Madison County (northwest)

Major highways
  Interstate 69
  State Road 32
  State Road 332

Cemeteries

 * Yorktown Cemetery, 2367-2399 S Elm St, Yorktown, IN 47396; Downtown Yorktown. Oldest stone 1830. Oldest portion about 1 1/2 acres. Latitude: 40.1725 Longitude: 85.4914
 * Hawk Cemetery, 10501 W Division Rd, Yorktown, IN 47396; Large cemetery. Founded circa 1835. Oldest part over 2 acres. Latitude: 40.1936, Longitude: 85.5108
  Jones/Pleasant Run Cemetery 820 W, Reed Station, IN; Take 332 to 820 W. Go north. Cemetery is on the south side of the curve. 10 acres, older section less than an acre. Large cemetery. Oldest marker 1831. Latitude: 40.2178, Longitude: 85.5461
 * McKinley Cemetery, Cheyenne Cul-De-Sac, Yorktown, IN 47396; More than 30 stones. Founded circa 1832. Relatives of President William McKinley and Benjamin Harrison buried here. Latitude: 40.1989, Longitude: 85.4706
 * Mt. Pleasant Cemetery, 2900-4198 S Highbanks Rd, Daleville, IN 47334; Large cemetery in Mt. Pleasant Township. Earliest monument 1840. Oldest section under one acre. Latitude: 40.1567, Longitude: 85.5508 PDF with more information
 * Stewart Cemetery, west edge of Yorktown; south bank of the White River; exact location unknown within Sections 21 and 22; no roads to cemetery.
 * Van Matre Cemetery, 700 W just north of the White River, Yorktown, IN, Section 20. Two markers 1880. Latitude: 40.1696, Longitude: 85.5191

References
 United States Census Bureau cartographic boundary files
 U.S. Board on Geographic Names

External links
 Indiana Township Association
 United Township Association of Indiana

Townships in Delaware County, Indiana
Townships in Indiana